is a Japanese politician and the current mayor of the city of Warabi in Saitama Prefecture. He is a member of the Japanese Communist Party.

External links 
 Personal homepage 

Mayors of places in Saitama Prefecture
1963 births
Living people
Japanese Communist Party politicians